Vallimalai Jain caves are located in Vallimalai village in Katpadi taluk of Vellore district, Tamil Nadu.

History 

Vallimalai Jain caves contains natural caverns that were inhabited by Digambar monks in early historic period. The monks from Bihar used to come here during the late-maurya period. The smooth and polished beds were carved during the rule of Satavahana dynasty. A total of five inscription are found with one of the inscriptions dating back to 8th century. The Jain carvings were created during the reign of Ganga King Rachamalla II in c. 870 CE after conquest of this region from Chola kings. An inscription, below the sculptures, states the name of Devasena of Bana Kingdom along with his Jain monks Bhavanandin and Aryanandin.

Vallaimalai was an important Jain center during 8th-9th century.

Architecture 

Vallimalai is an important Jain site with several carvings of sculptures of tirthankara. There is also a temple in the region which was converted to a Hindu temple. The caves consist of three chambers, two of these chambers contain images of Jain tirthankar. Above this group, there are the remains of a wall, believed to have been a small fort occupied by Jains. A torana is found above Jain images similar to carvings of Badami cave temples. 

The Jain sculpture are engraved on two spots, one on the norther side of Murugan temple and second on the southern side, with one sculpture with superhuman dimensions. There is an image of Ambika in sukhasana position wearing a necklace, armbands, and crown. Ambika is depicted sitting on a lion with carvings of her two sons below her pedestal. There is also image of Padmavati with 4 hands, holding goad and noose in upper right and left hands.

Conservation 
These caves are protected by Archaeological Survey of India. In 2014, "Ahima Walks" was organized in the region to promote the place.

See also 
 Kalugumalai Jain Beds
 Kupalantham Poigai malai Jain Cave Temple
 Seeyamangalam

Reference

Citations

Bibliography

Books

Web

External links 
 

9th-century Jain temples
Jain temples in Tamil Nadu
Vellore district
Jain rock-cut architecture
Caves of Tamil Nadu
Jain caves in India